Vitthal Patil is an Indian dancer, choreographer, film actor and producer. He was a former judge on the reality dance show, Halla Bol, shown on ETV Marathi. He has also choreographed for the films Naach, Khoya Khoya Chand, Dus Kahaniyaan, Acid Factory, Hijack and Aa Dekhen Zara. He has also produced the film, Ringan, which received the National Award for Best Marathi Movie. He has also acted in, produced and choreographed the recent film, Youngraad. He has won titles on the TV shows Dance Premier League and Zara Nachke Dikha.

Early life

Vitthal Patil was born into a farming family in Malikwad, Belgaum district, Karnataka. He is the youngest of seven siblings. In his early years, Vitthal spent his time farming and attending school. He studied Arts at Wadai College (Pune). Later, he completed a course to become an electrician from the Industrial Training Institute and went on to work at NCVT Hindustan Antibiotics in Pune for one year. He also completed an internship at TATA Engineering and Locomotive Company (TELCO). He has also represented Maharashtra in athletic meets.

Career
After spending a year working for Hindustan Antibiotics (Pune), Patil visited Mumbai where his friends took him to see film shoots, dance sequences, and the rest of production. This experience encouraged him to take dance seriously and to pursue professional dancing.

Patil started his Bollywood career as a background dancer with choreographers Farah Khan, Saroj Khan, Vaibhavi Merchant, Ahmed Khan and Remo D'Souza, among many others, after which he partnered with Harshall Kamat. He went on to choreograph winners of Nach Baliye, Dance Premier League and other such dance reality shows and music videos. He has also choreographed international stage shows, Bollywood shows, various Hindi, Marathi and South Indian films and also corporate launches, feature films, ad films and music videos. His film Ringan  won the 63rd National Award.

He also choreographed recent Netflix film Yeh Ballet.

He has also appeared on the TV shows Nautanki The Comedy Theatre, Comedy Circus Ke Ajoobe, Comedy Circus Ka Naya Daur, Comedy Circus Ke Mahabali, Sab Ki Holi, Comedy Ka Jashn, Screen Awards, Indian Idol, Just Dance and Aaja Mahivey. He also won Zara Nachke Dikha and was a judge on the ETC Marathi show Halla Bol.

Filmography

Film

Television

Stage appearances
 A.R. Rahman's Live Concert
 Directed & Choreographed Ajay Atul's concert
 Walt Disney
 Jai Jai Maharashtra maza

Other Works
 Coles TVC 
 Kickapoo TVC

References

External links
 

Indian choreographers
1975 births
Living people